An Over-Incubated Baby (AKA: The Wonderful Baby Incubator) is a 1901 British short  silent comedy film, directed by Walter R. Booth, featuring a woman who gets an unpleasant surprise after placing her baby in Professor Bakem's baby incubator for 12 months growth in one hour. The film is, "one of the most original of the trick films made by W.R. Booth and R.W. Paul in 1901," and according to Michael Brooke of BFI Screenonline, "one of the less elaborate films made by Booth and Paul that year," "though the concept itself is so imaginative that it arguably didn't need any more than basic jump-cut transformations."

See also 
 1901 in science fiction

References

External links

1901 films
British black-and-white films
British silent short films
1901 comedy films
1901 short films
Articles containing video clips
British comedy short films
Films directed by Walter R. Booth
Silent comedy films